Real World/Road Rules Challenge: Fresh Meat is the 12th season of the MTV reality game show, The Challenge (at the time known as Real World/Road Rules Challenge).

Fresh Meat is a season that made history on The Challenge by being the first season to include previously unknown contestants as part of the cast. Previous to Fresh Meat, all seasons functioned solely by the program's trademark: strictly using contestants that were previously cast on past seasons of The Real World or Road Rules.

Filmed in Australia, Fresh Meat featured two-player teams; each team had an alumnus of The Real World or Road Rules partnered with a newcomer to the Challenge (collectively known as the "Fresh Meat"). This is the first edition of the Fresh Meat series, with Fresh Meat II following in 2010. A launch special aired May 22, 2006, a week before the season premiere.

Contestants

Format
Prior to the season, each of the 12 newcomers (referred to as "Fresh Meat") participates in a series of challenges to test their skills. Each alumnus selects one of the rookies of the opposite sex to be their partner for the entire season, using the stats from the pre-season challenges.

In odd-numbered episodes, teams participate in a challenge. (Challenges are sometimes called "missions.") The winner of the challenge has immunity from going into Exile, and selects one team to go into Exile. They also get the chance to pick the order in the next challenge. The remaining teams get together to vote for the other Exile team; the winning team and their pick for the Exile are not present during the process. Each individual gets a vote, and voting is not secret. The team with the most votes is picked to go into Exile.

In even-numbered episodes, teams participate in another challenge. If one of the two teams picked for Exile wins the challenge (sometimes referred to on the show as winning the "pardon"), they can select another team to go into Exile in their place, however, they cannot pick the team that won the previous challenge as that team has immunity. They also receive a prize and will get to pick the order in the next challenge. The challenge of this episode is followed by the Exile.

Exile is a race between two teams. Unlike the elimination games of other seasons of The Challenge, the remaining teams do not watch the battle between the two Exile teams. The Exile teams run a course and whoever crosses the finish line first stays, while the other team goes home. Along the way, there are two optional puzzle stations where, if the puzzle is solved correctly, they will get a prize that will benefit them in the race (such as dropping their bags or taking minutes off their total time.) To make matters more difficult, each member will be carrying bags equal to the weight of the luggage they brought to the Challenge.

A car picks them up and they are taken, blindfolded, to the race course. Once the car stops, they must jump out and go on with the race. Both team members must cross the finish line, but it doesn't matter who carries what bags.

Initially, the final challenge was to consist of four teams, with first-place winning $250,000, second place $30,000, third place $20,000 and fourth place winning nothing. However, due to the medical disqualification of Team Coral & Evan, host T. J. Lavin explained to each team in Episode 11 that the final challenge would consist of three teams, with all finalists winning money.

Teams

Stats
Each of the 12 Fresh Meat cast members participated in a multi-challenge obstacle course, testing their strength, stamina, and mental ability. 
The multi-challenge obstacle course included:

 A 40-yard dash
 A series of wall climbs
 Precision throwing 
 A brainteaser puzzle

The alumni used the stats from each player's obstacle course performance to determine their partner.

Draft selections

Gameplay

Challenge games
 Stuck On Me: Players are connected to their partners, back-to-back, by a harness, on a 25-foot narrow balance beam that is hanging from the top of the Q1 building. Each team has to walk toward a white line at the end of the beam, then do a full 360° turn, and walk back to the beginning of the beam. The team that walks to the end of the beam and back in the fastest time wins.
 Winners: Coral & Evan
 Bush Whacked: Twenty tree stumps are placed within a circle — eight on an interior ring, and twelve on the exterior ring. The stumps on the interior ring are two feet high, while the stumps on the exterior ring are three feet high. Each team stands on a designated stump on the interior ring, and has to swing a hanging medicine ball in an attempt to knock an opposing team off their stump. A team is disqualified if one player holds the medicine ball for more than three seconds. The challenge is played in three rounds, and after four teams are eliminated from the first round, each team moves to the three-foot stumps. The last team standing on their designated stump wins.
 Winners: Coral & Evan
 Hang On: The male players from each team are hanging upside down from leg harnesses, and have to "hang on" to their female partners, while being hoisted 20 feet above water. A team's time stops once a player falls into the water. The team that hangs on the longest time wins.
 Winners: Coral & Evan
 Jail Break: Players from each team have to escape from a jail cell, by finding three keys that are located inside six bowls of "prison slop." Each player is suited up in "jailbird" jumpsuits, with their hands behind their backs in handcuffs and their legs in shackles. Each player has to search through each bowl of slop using only their faces and mouths. Once a team has found the three keys that are needed to unlock each other's handcuffs and the jail cell, each player will sprint down a 50-yard dash (with their legs still in shackles) to a finish line. The team with the fastest time wins.
 Winners: Theo & Chanda
 Climber's Paradise: Each team has to ascend up a 25-foot climbing wall, by using pegs of different shapes and colors. Each player has to carry the pegs up, and communicate with each other in order to determine the peg shapes necessary to ascend the wall. A team is disqualified if they do not make it to the top of the wall within a 10-minute time limit, or if one or both players falls off the climbing wall. The team that makes it to the top of the wall and retrieves a flag in the fastest time wins.
 Winners: Coral & Evan
 Rollin' In Oats: Two tubs of rolled oats are located across a grass field from corresponding deposit tubs. Players from each team have to smother their bodies with oatmeal, then sprint toward their designated deposit tubs, and scrape off the oatmeal from their bodies into the tubs. Each team goes back and forth for a two-minute period, trying to deposit as much oatmeal into their tubs as possible. The team that distributes the heaviest weight of oatmeal into their designated tub wins.
 Winners: Coral & Evan
 Crossed Paths: A rope that is suspended 25 feet above water connects two platforms, and the goal for each team is for each player to make their way from one platform to the other. Players will meet their teammate midway through, in which they will "cross paths," and make their way toward the opposite platforms. A team is disqualified if one player falls into the water. The team with the fastest time wins.
 Winners: Theo & Chanda
 Incredible Deflating Kayak: Teams have to inflate a kayak using either their mouths or foot pedals, then paddle their way across to an opposite side of a river, grab their team flag, then paddle their way back to the original launching area. A team has to start over if one or both players sticks their hands or legs outside of the kayak while in the paddling process. Once each team had paddled back to the original launching area, they have to deflate their kayak, and stuff it back in the bags that contained the kayaks. The team with the fastest time wins.
 Winners: Shane & Linette
 Swimming With Sharks: Teams have to solve a puzzle that is floating on a frame within a shark lagoon. Players from each team have to swim down into the lagoon, relay style, and retrieve the pieces needed to solve the puzzle. A team has ten minutes to assemble the puzzle pieces together, or they will be disqualified. Only one team competes at a time, and all other teams are quarantined in order to avoid getting an advantage prior to their turn. The team that solves a puzzle in the fastest time wins.
 Winners: Shane & Linette
 Human Ox Pull: Teams have to pull and drag a heavy sled across a dirt field. The challenge is played in multiple rounds, with eight teams split up into two separate teams of four. In the first round, each teams has to drag an 850-pound sled with a bale of hay from one side of a dirt field to another. The first team to drag their sled to the finish line wins the first round. The four winning teams from the first round are then split up into two teams of two, and have to drag a 350-pound sled to the finish line. The team that makes it to the finish line first wins. In the final round, the same process continues, with the final two 2-player teams competing to win the challenge.
 Winners: Darrell & Aviv
 Batten Down The Hatches: Teams have to make their way up and down a dive boat that is hanging 25 feet above a lake, with rope ladders hanging from both sides. First, each player has to climb down to the bottom of the hanging ladder, with both feet on the bottom rung, then each player has to swing toward their partner and trade ladders, then climb back to the top of the ladder, and into the boat. The team time stops when both partners have made their way back into the boat. The team that climbs back into the boat in the fastest time wins.
 Winners: Derrick & Diem
 Jump Down Under: Teams have to jump  from a platform down into a lake, swim 20 feet toward an oversize super launch, then climb atop the launch in the middle of the lake that is supported by a rope ladder, grab their team flag, then swim toward a pair of floating flag poles located 30 feet from the super launch. The team that completes the challenge in the fastest time wins.
 Winners: Derrick & Diem
 Deep Blue: On a boat traveling along Australia's Gold Coast, teams have to drop 30 feet into the water, from a free-diving sled attached to a boat, retrieve their team flag attached to the bottom of the rope, then hold their breath under water for as long as possible. A team's time stops once a player's head pokes above the water's surface. The team that can hold their breath under water for the longest time wins.
 Winners: Derrick & Diem
 Target Training: Two teams at a time have to race through dual obstacle courses, grab a pair of paintball guns at the end of the course, knock down four targets, retrieve a 70-pound Aboriginal artifact, then make their way back to the start of the course with the artifact. The team that makes it through the obstacle course, with their artifact, in the fastest time wins $1,500.
 Winners: Darrell & Aviv (received a pardon from the Exile)
 What a Croc: Teams are placed on a "crocodile wheel," and are spun around until at least one body part touches the end of the wheel, or if one player falls off the wheel, in which a team's time will be stopped. Each team is spun around three times. The team with the longest combined time not only wins an automatic bid in the final challenge, but also chooses two of the final three remaining teams for the last Exile.
 Winners: Tina & Kenny

Exiles
Exile is a race between two teams with a start and a finish, and two puzzles in between. The puzzles are optional and can be skipped by the teams, however, teams must grab their flag at each puzzle before proceeding. Puzzles that are completed may result in a reward significant to the remainder of the race. Couples will be carrying bags that, when combined, equal the amount of luggage each cast member brought with them to the Challenge. Couples must carry the bags at all times, unless a reward allows them to drop them.

There are three different Exile courses on this season: Beach, Forest, and Cliffside. Each Exile contains a start, a finish, and two puzzles; however, the terrain of the course may affect a team's performance. Teams that participated on each course are as follows:

 Beach Course: Wes & Casey vs. Danny & Evelyn, Tina & Kenny vs. Katie & Eric, Tina & Kenny vs. Theo & Chanda
 Forest Course: Wes & Casey vs. Melinda & Ryan, Wes & Casey vs. Tonya & Johnnie, Darrell & Aviv vs. Derrick & Diem
 Cliffside Course: Wes & Casey vs. Johanna & Jesse, Wes & Casey vs. Shane & Linette

Final challenge
 Miles of Exile: The three remaining teams compete in a 10-mile sprint along the beach, with teammates roped to each other, and have to encounter several checkpoints and solve two puzzles. At the first checkpoint, each team has to run outside of buoys, through the water, to the second checkpoint, which is a "peg-jumping" puzzle station. There are four sandbags that weigh 25 pounds each next to an empty duffle bag. Each team will be given three attempts to correctly solve a puzzle. If a team solves the puzzle on the first attempt, they will be allowed to continue to the next checkpoint without having to carry any sandbags into their designated duffle bag. After the second unsuccessful attempt, a team will be required to add 50 pounds to their designated duffle bag. If a team does not correctly solve a puzzle after the third attempt, that team will be required to add all four sandbags to their duffle bag, and carry it to the next checkpoint. Darrell & Aviv solved the puzzle after the third attempt, in which they were required to add 50 pounds to their duffle bag, while Tina & Kenny and Wes Casey each failed to solve the puzzles after three attempts. The third checkpoint is "Military Crawl," in which each team has to crawl under military-style posts, but have to drag their duffle bags under the posts, and are not allowed to throw their duffle bags over the posts. After the military crawl, each team must still carry the weight of their designated duffle bags to the fourth checkpoint, "Carry Your Partner," in which the male partners carry their female partners to the next checkpoint while continuing to carry their duffle bags until they reach a sign that says "continue to your next checkpoint." The fifth checkpoint is "Stick Squares" puzzle station, in which teams must make two equal squares by moving four sticks. This puzzle station is the reverse of the first puzzle station, in which teams can remove all 100 pounds from their duffle bags if they correctly solve a puzzle on their first attempt, 50 pounds if they solve a puzzle on a second attempt, but will be required to carry the weight of all sandbags if they do not correctly solve a puzzle after the third attempt. Darrell & Aviv correctly solved the puzzle after the first attempt, in which they removed all weight from their duffle bags. Neither Tina & Kenny nor Wes & Casey solved the second puzzle after three attempts, and were forced to carry all of the weight of their duffle bags up a mountain side to the finish line.
 Real World/Road Rules Challenge: Fresh Meat Winners: Darrell & Aviv (won $250,000)
 Second-place: Tina & Kenny (won $30,000)
 Third-place: Wes & Casey (won $20,000)

Game summary

Elimination chart

Exile progress

 The team won the competition
 The team did not win the final challenge
 The team won the challenge
 The team won the challenge and a pardon
 The team was selected for the Exile
 The team won the Exile
 The team was put into Exile by the team that won a pardon and won
 The team lost in the Exile and was eliminated
 The team was removed from the competition due to injury

Voting progress

Challenge placings

Episodes

Reunion special
The reunion special, Well Done: The Fresh Meat Reunion, was aired on September 11, 2006, and was hosted by Susie Castillo. It was revealed on the reunion show that Casey spent her $10,000 on breast implants, and Wes said he spent his on Johanna. Kenny spent his $15,000 on a wrestling ring.

After filming
In October 2011, Starkman and Santucci were named in a lawsuit filed by fellow castmember Tonya Cooley, in which Cooley claimed that she was raped with a toothbrush while passed out from heavy drinking, during filming of season 18 of The Real World/Road Rules Challenge. The case was settled out of court on October 24, 2012. The details of the settlement have not been made public. Since then, Starkman got married and welcomed his first son.

Casey Cooper and Ryan Kehoe were flown out to Argentina with the initial cast of The Challenge: All Stars to serve as alternates although both were sent home after not being used. Both Cooper and Kehoe were ultimately cast on the second season of The Challenge: All Stars. Shortly after her appearance on the reality competition series, Cooper announced her pregnancy, and married husband Kyle Toups on December 7, 2021.

Death of Diem Brown
During the filming of Fresh Meat, Diem Brown secretly revealed to her partner Derrick Kosinski and Aviv Melmed that she was diagnosed with ovarian cancer. During the Fresh Meat reunion show in 2006, MTV donated $5,000 to her then-charity organization liveforthechallenge. In June 2012, after six years of remission, she announced that she was diagnosed with cancer for a second time. Shortly after successful completion of chemotherapy in February 2013, she competed in The Challenge: Rivals II. However, one year later, while filming her eighth (and final) challenge, Battle of the Exes II in Panama, she collapsed on set and was immediately air-lifted to a New York-area hospital, where she was subsequently diagnosed with cancer for a third time, though she kept it hidden for two months prior to filming. Brown died on November 14, 2014, at the age of 34.

Subsequent challenges

Challenges in bold indicate the challenger was a finalist on the Challenge.

Note: Evan appeared as a color commentator on Spring Break Challenge.

Notes

References

External links
 
 MTV's official Real World website
 MTV's official Road Rules website

The Challenge (TV series)
2006 American television seasons
Television shows set in New South Wales
Television shows filmed in Australia